Dukhovnitsky (masculine), Dukhovnitskaya (feminine), or Dukhovnitskoye (neuter) may refer to:
Dukhovnitsky District, a district of Saratov Oblast, Russia
Dukhovnitskoye, an urban locality (a work settlement) in Dukhovnitsky District of Saratov Oblast, Russia